The Revolutionary Party of Democratic Unification was the ruling party in El Salvador during the 1950s and early 1960s.

History
The party was established 1945 as the official party of the military rulers. In the 1950 general elections, its candidate Óscar Osorio won the presidential elections, whilst the party won 38 of the 52 seats in the Constitutional Assembly. It was the only party to contest the 1952 and 1954 legislative elections. In the 1956 presidential elections several opposition candidates were barred from standing by the Central Elections Council, allowing its candidate, José María Lemus, to win with over 95% of the vote. In the legislative elections that year it again won all 54 seats, despite facing opposition from the National Action Party.

The party won the 1958 legislative elections unopposed, and again won all 54 seats in the 1960 elections despite the NAP running again.

Electoral history

Presidential elections

Legislative Assembly elections

References 

Defunct political parties in El Salvador
Political parties established in 1945
1945 establishments in El Salvador